is a district located in Miyazaki Prefecture, Japan.

As of October 1, 2019, the district has an estimated population of 19,152 and the density of 27.9 persons per km2. The total area is 686.94 km2.

Towns and villages
Gokase
Hinokage
Takachiho

Districts in Miyazaki Prefecture